Bert: The Last Virgin is a Swedish film which was released to cinemas in Sweden on 25 December 1995, based on the Bert Diaries by Anders Jacobsson and Sören Olsson. It introduces new characters to the Bert Universe and uses actors like Martin Andersson and Cajsalisa Ejemyr.

Plot
In contemporary Öreskoga, Sweden lives 15 years old Bert Ljung. He attends the 9th grade at school in Sweden and only "thinks of girls", and thinks most of his friends have "done it".

Production
The film was recorded between 27 March - 2 June 1995 in Solna, Vällingby and Kärrtorp Secondary School in Kärrtorp.

Reception
The film was rated 7 in Sweden

It was the second highest-grossing Swedish film for 1996, behind The Hunters, with a gross of $2,603,905.

Home video
The film was released to VHS in 1996 and DVD in 2008.

References

External links
 
 

1995 films
1995 comedy films
Swedish comedy films
1990s Swedish-language films
Films based on works by Anders Jacobsson and Sören Olsson
Films directed by Tomas Alfredson
1995 directorial debut films
1990s Swedish films